The T5 Eminönü–Alibeyköy Coach Station tram line is a tram line following the coastline of the Golden Horn on the European side of Istanbul, Turkey.

Construction of the line began in 2016.

Its route mostly follows the western coastline of the Golden Horn, and is built on the bank next to the existing street. In some places, it crosses the water on piles. The total travel time was assumed to be 35 minutes. 

The line uses Alstom's APS (a third rail embedded in the ground between the tracks) for electrification to avoid visual pollution, a difference from other tram lines in the city, which have traditional overhead wires suspended from roadside posts.

Stations and connections
The 14 stations and their connections to other lines are as following:

See also
 Istanbul Tram
 Istanbul Metro
 Istanbul nostalgic tramways
 Public transport in Istanbul
Haliç

References

Tram transport in Istanbul
Fatih
Eyüp
Transport infrastructure under construction in Turkey
Golden Horn